Karl Weber (8 March 1898 in Arensberg – 21 May 1985 in Koblenz) was a West German politician with the Christian Democratic Union. He served as the Minister of Justice from 2 April 1965 until his replacement by Richard Jaeger in 26 October of that same year.
From 1916 till 1918 he served in the First World War, then he studied legal science in Bonn.
From 1939 till 1945 he served in the Second World War.

References

Justice ministers of Germany
1898 births
1985 deaths
Grand Crosses with Star and Sash of the Order of Merit of the Federal Republic of Germany
Members of the Bundestag for Rhineland-Palatinate
Members of the Bundestag 1961–1965
Members of the Bundestag 1957–1961
Members of the Bundestag 1953–1957
Members of the Bundestag 1949–1953
Members of the Bundestag for the Christian Democratic Union of Germany